The following is a list of churches in Weymouth and Portland.

List 

 All Saints Church, Wyke Regis
 Avalanche Memorial Church
 Broadwey Methodist Church
 Easton Methodist Church, Portland
 Holy Trinity Church, Weymouth
 Hope United Reformed Church, Weymouth
 St Andrew's Church, Portland
 St John's Church, Weymouth
 St Laurence's Church, Upwey
 St Mary's Church, Weymouth
 St Paul's Church, Weymouth
 Underhill Methodist Church, Portland
 United Reformed Church, Portland
 United Reformed Church, Upwey
 Weymouth Baptist Church
 Wyke Regis Methodist Church

Weymouth and Portland
Weymouth and Portland
Weymouth and Portland